Graham Wilson may refer to:
 Graham Wilson (rugby league) (1949–2005), Australian rugby league footballer
 Graham Wilson (cricketer) (born 1970), former English cricketer
 Sir Graham Selby Wilson (1895–1987), bacteriologist
 Graham Malcolm Wilson, British physician and pioneer of clinical pharmacology

See also
 Graeme Wilson (disambiguation)
 Grahame Wilson, Rhodesian Army officer